Władysław Szerner (Warsaw, 3 June 1836 - Unterhaching, 4 January 1915) was a Polish painter.

He studied at the Academy of Fine Arts in Warsaw from 1862 and from 1865 at the Academy of Fine Arts in Munich.

After his studies, he stayed in Munich and worked mainly as a horse painter. With his friend Józef Brandt, he travelled through Volhynia and Ukraine.

He was a member of the Kunstverein München (1874-1909).

His son, Władysław Karol Szerner (1870—1936), was also a painter; he used to sign as Władysław Szerner Jr. and he often copied painting by his father.

References

1836 births
1915 deaths
19th-century Polish painters
19th-century Polish male artists
20th-century Polish painters
20th-century Polish male artists
Academy of Fine Arts, Munich alumni
Animal painters
Polish male painters